This page details statistics of the All-Ireland Senior Hurling Championship.

General performances

By province

Counties

By decade
The most successful team of each decade, judged by number of All-Ireland Senior Hurling Championship titles, is as follows:

 1890s: 4 each for Cork (1890, 92, 93, 94) and Tipperary (1895, 96, 98, 99)
 1900s: 4 for Kilkenny (1904, 05, 07, 09)
 1910s: 3 for Kilkenny (1911, 12, 13)
 1920s: 3 each for Dublin (1920, 24, 27) and Cork (1926, 28, 29)
 1930s: 4 for Kilkenny (1932, 33, 35, 39)
 1940s: 5 for Cork (1941, 42, 43, 44, 46)
 1950s: 3 each for Tipperary (1950, 51, 58) and Cork (1952, 53, 54)
 1960s: 4 for Tipperary (1961, 62, 64, 65)
 1970s: 4 each for Cork (1970, 76, 77, 78) and Kilkenny (1972, 74, 75, 79)
 1980s: 3 for Galway (1980, 87, 88)
 1990s: 2 each for Cork (1990, 99); Kilkenny (1992, 93); Offaly (1994, 98) and Clare (1995, 97)
 2000s: 7 for Kilkenny (2000, 02, 03, 06, 07, 08, 09)
 2010s: 4 for Kilkenny (2011, 12, 14, 15)

By semi-final appearances

As of 05 June 2022

Consecutive Wins

Quadruple
 Cork (1941, 1942, 1943, 1944)
 Kilkenny (2006, 2007, 2008, 2009)

Treble
 Cork (1892, 1893, 1894)
 Tipperary (1898, 1899, 1900)
 Kilkenny (1911, 1912, 1913)
 Tipperary (1949, 1950, 1951)
 Cork (1952, 1953, 1954)
 Cork (1976, 1977, 1978)
 Limerick (2020, 2021, 2022)

Double
 Tipperary (1895, 1896)
 Cork (1902, 1903)
 Kilkenny (1904, 1905)
 Cork (1928, 1929)
 Kilkenny (1932, 1933)
 Wexford (1955, 1956)
 Tipperary (1961, 1962)
 Tipperary (1964, 1965)
 Kilkenny (1974, 1975)
 Kilkenny (1982, 1983)
 Galway (1987, 1988)
 Kilkenny (1992, 1993)
 Kilkenny (2002, 2003)
 Cork (2004, 2005)
 Kilkenny (2011, 2012)
 Kilkenny (2014, 2015)

Single
 Tipperary (1887, 1906, 1908, 1916, 1925, 1930, 1937, 1945, 1958, 1971, 1989, 1991, 2001, 2010, 2016, 2019)
 Dublin (1889, 1917, 1920, 1924, 1927, 1938)
 Cork (1890, 1919, 1926, 1931, 1946, 1966, 1970, 1984, 1986, 1990, 1999)
 Kerry (1891)
 Limerick (1897, 1918, 1921, 1934, 1936, 1940, 1973, 2018)
 London (1901)
 Kilkenny (1907, 1909, 1922, 1935, 1939, 1947, 1957, 1963, 1967, 1969, 1972, 1979, 2000)
 Wexford (1910, 1960, 1968, 1996)
 Clare (1914, 1995, 1997, 2013)
 Laois (1915)
 Galway (1923, 1980, 2017)
 Waterford (1948, 1959)
 Offaly (1981, 1985, 1994, 1998)

Other records

Beaten sides
Between 1887 and 1996 the championship was played on a straight knock out format whereby the All-Ireland champions were the only undefeated team of the competition.  The introduction of the qualifier system in 1997 has resulted in seven 'back-door' All-Ireland champions:
 Offaly (1998) were beaten by Kilkenny in the Leinster final.
 Cork (2004) were beaten by Waterford in the Munster final.
 Tipperary (2010) were beaten by Cork in the first round of the Munster championship.
Kilkenny (2012) were beaten by Galway in the Leinster final.
 Clare (2013) were beaten by Cork in the Munster semi-final.
Limerick (2018) were beaten by Clare in Munster round 4.
Tipperary (2019) were beaten by Limerick in the Munster final.

On a number of occasions teams have been defeated twice but have remained in the championship:
 Limerick (2005) were beaten by Tipperary and Galway but still qualified for the All-Ireland quarter-final.
 Waterford (2005) were beaten by Cork and Clare but still qualified for the All-Ireland quarter-final.
 Limerick (2006) were beaten by Tipperary and Clare but still qualified for the All-Ireland quarter-final.
 Cork (2007) were beaten by Waterford and Tipperary but still qualified for the All-Ireland quarter-final.

Final success rate
Only one county has appeared in the final once, being victorious on that occasion:
Kerry (1891)

Historic success rate
When a county won its first All Ireland before losing a final at a later time
Tipperary (1887–1909)

On the opposite end of the scale, only one county has appeared in the final more than once, losing on each occasion:
Antrim (1943, 1989)

Winning other trophies
Although not an officially recognised achievement, a number of teams have achieved the distinction of winning the All-Ireland championship, their provincial championship and the National Hurling League:
 Kilkenny in 1933, 1982, 1983, 2002, 2003, 2006, 2009 and 2014.
 Tipperary in 1949, 1950, 1961, 1964, 1965 and 2001.
 Cork in 1926, 1941 and 1953.
 Limerick in 1934, 1936 and 2020.
 Galway in 1987 and 2017.
 Wexford in 1956.

Biggest wins
 The most one sided All-Ireland finals:
 34 points – 1896: Tipperary 8–14 – 0–4 Dublin
 29 points – 1894: Cork 5–20 – 2–0 Dublin
 27 points – 1943: Cork 5–16 – 0–4 Antrim
 27 points – 1928: Cork 6–12 – 1–0 Galway
 26 points – 1918: Limerick 9–5 – 1–3 Wexford
 23 points – 2008: Kilkenny 3–30 – 1–13 Waterford
 The most one sided All-Ireland semi-finals:
 52 points – 1900: Galway 10–23 – 0–1 Antrim
 44 points – 1954: Wexford 12–17 – 2–3 Antrim
 36 points – 1925: Tipperary 12–9 – 2–3 Antrim
 35 points – 1912: Limerick 11–4 – 0–2 Antrim
 35 points – 1904: Cork 8–18 – 2–3 Antrim
 The most one sided All-Ireland quarter-finals:
 36 points – 1906: Kilkenny 7–21 – 1–3 Antrim
 34 points – 1971: Galway 7–24 – 1–8 Antrim
 30 points – 1986: Galway 4–24 – 1–3 Kerry
 26 points – 1988: Galway 4–30 – 2–8 London
 26 points – 1996: Galway 4–22 – 0–8 New York
 The most one sided Munster finals:
 31 points – 1918: Limerick 11–3 – 1–2 Clare
 31 points – 1982: Cork 5–31 – 3–6 Waterford
 28 points – 1893: Cork 5–13 – 0–0 Limerick
 27 points – 1903: Cork 5–16 – 1–1 Waterford
 26 points – 1905: Cork 7–12 – 1–4 Limerick
 The most one sided Leinster finals:
 28 points – 1916: Kilkenny 11–3 – 2–2 Wexford
 22 points – 1954: Wexford 8–5 – 1–4 Dublin
 21 points – 1901: Wexford 7–6 – 1–3 Offaly
 20 points – 1913: Kilkenny 7–5 – 2–1 Dublin
 19 points – 1928: Dublin 9–7 – 4–3 Offaly
 The most one sided Ulster finals:
 35 points – 1906: Donegal 5–21 – 0-01 Antrim
 29 points – 1901: Antrim 0–41 – 0–12 Derry
 28 points – 1930: Antrim 10-04 – 2-00 Down
 27 points – 1935: Antrim 7-09 – 0-03 Cavan
 26 points – 2007: Antrim 2–24 – 0-04 Down
 The most one sided Connacht finals:
 41 points – 1922: Galway 12-08 – 1-00 Roscommon
 38 points – 1997: Galway 6–24 – 0-05 Roscommon
 24 points – 1999: Galway 4–26 – 2-08 Roscommon
 21 points – 1905: Galway 3–15 – 1-00 Mayo
 18 points – 1909: Mayo 10-01 – 4-01 Galway

Successful defending
Only 6 teams of the 13 who have won the All-Ireland championship have ever successfully defended the title. These are:

 Kilkenny on 13 attempts out of 36 (1905, 1912, 1913, 1933, 1975, 1983, 1993, 2003, 2007, 2008, 2009, 2012, 2015)
 Cork on 12 attempts out of 30 (1893, 1894, 1903, 1929, 1942, 1943, 1944, 1953, 1954, 1977, 1978, 2005)
 Tipperary on 7 attempts out of 28 (1896, 1899, 1900, 1950, 1951, 1962, 1965)
 Limerick on 2 attempts out of 11 (2021, 2022)
 Wexford on 1 attempt out of 6 (1956)
 Galway on 1 attempt out of 5 (1988)

Gaps

 Longest gaps between successive All-Ireland titles: 
 81 years: Clare (1914–1995)
 57 years: Galway (1923–1980)
 45 years: Wexford (1910–1955) 
 45 years: Limerick (1973–2018)
 33 years: Limerick (1940–1973)
 29 years: Galway (1988–2017)
 28 years: Dublin (1889–1917)
 28 years: Wexford (1968–1996)
 21 years: Limerick (1897–1918)
 Longest gaps between successive All-Ireland final appearances: 
 63 years: Clare (1932–1995)
 46 years: Antrim (1943–1989)
 45 years: Waterford (1963–2008)
 34 years: Laois (1915–1949)
 33 years: Wexford (1918–1951)
 33 years: Limerick (1940–1973)

Provinces
Only on six occasions has the All-Ireland final involved two teams from the same province:
Tipperary vs Clare (1997)
Kilkenny vs Offaly (1998)
Kilkenny vs Offaly (2000)
Cork vs Clare (2013)
Limerick vs Waterford (2020)
Limerick vs Cork (2021)
The province providing the highest number of different winning teams is Munster, with six: Clare, Cork, Kerry, Limerick, Tipperary and Waterford.

Longest undefeated run
The record for the longest unbeaten run stands at 21 games held by Kilkenny. It began with a 1–23 to 1–9 win against Westmeath in their opening game of the 2006 championship and finished with a 3–22 to 0–19 win against Cork in the All-Ireland semi-final of the 2010 championship. The 21-game unbeaten streak, which included no drawn game, ended with a 4–17 to 1–18 loss to Tipperary in the 2010 All-Ireland final.

This broke the previous record of 16 consecutive games unbeaten by Tipperary, which began in May 1949 with a victory in the opening round of the championship, and ended with a seventeen-point defeat of Waterford in the Munster semi-final of the 1952 championship. The 16-game unbeaten streak, which included 15 wins and one draw, ended with a 1–11 to 2–6 loss to Cork in the subsequent Munster final.

Players

All-time top scorers

As of match played 17 July 2022 (19:26)

All-time appearances

As of match played 17 July 2022 (20:25)

Other records

Most wins

 Henry Shefflin from Kilkenny is the only player to win ten All-Ireland medals on the field of play: 2000, 2002, 2003, 2006, 2007, 2008, 2009, 2011, 2012, 2014
 Five players have won nine All-Ireland medals through a combination of being on the field and as non-playing substitutes:
Noel Hickey of Kilkenny: 2000, 2002, 2003, 2006, 2007, 2008, 2009, 2011, 2012
Noel Skehan of Kilkenny: 1963, 1967, 1969, 1972, 1974, 1975, 1979, 1982, 1983
J.J. Delaney of Kilkenny: 2002, 2003, 2006, 2007, 2008, 2009, 2011, 2012, 2014
Tommy Walsh of Kilkenny: 2002, 2003, 2006, 2007, 2008, 2009, 2011, 2012, 2014
Jackie Tyrrell of Kilkenny: 2003, 2006, 2007, 2008, 2009, 2011, 2012, 2014, 2015
Winners of All-Ireland medals on the field of play in three decades::
Paddy 'Balty' Ahern (Cork) (1919, 1926, 1927, 1929, 1931)
Frank Cummins (Kilkenny) (1969, 1972, 1974, 1975, 1979, 1982, 1983)
Jimmy Doyle (Tipperary) (1958, 1961, 1962, 1964, 1965, 1971)
John Doyle (Tipperary) (1949, 1950, 1951, 1958, 1961, 1962, 1964, 1965)
Tommy Doyle (Tipperary) (1937, 1945, 1949, 1950, 1951)
Declan Ryan (Tipperary) (1989, 1991, 2001)

All-Ireland final appearances

Single All-Ireland final top scorers

Cumulative All-Ireland final top scorers
As of 17 July 2022

Longest lived All-Ireland medal winners

100+

90+

Disciplinary
At least eight players have been sent off in an All-Ireland final: Dick Carroll of Kilkenny and John Barron of Waterford in the 1959 final replay, Tom Ryan of Tipperary and Lar Foley of Dublin in the 1961 final, Éamonn Scallan of Wexford in the 1996 final; Benny Dunne of Tipperary in the 2009 final, Cyril Donnellan of Galway in the 2012 final replay and Richie Hogan of Kilkenny in the 2019 final.

Managers

Records
Danny O'Connell was the main trainer for the Kilkenny Senior Hurling team in the early years of the G.A.A and managed to win twelve All-Ireland senior titles, in 1904, 1905, 1907, 1909, 1911, 1912, 1913, 1922, 1932, 1933, 1935 and 1939.

 Brian Cody is the only manager to win the All-Ireland title eleven times, in 2000, 2002, 2003, 2006, 2007, 2008, 2009, 2011, 2012, 2014, 2015 (all Kilkenny).
 Just two managers have reached the All-Ireland final with two different teams: 
 Michael "Babs" Keating with Galway (1979) and Tipperary (1988, 1989, 1991).
 Davy Fitzgerald with Waterford (2008) and Clare (2013).
 In 2009, Justin McCarthy became the first manager to reach the All-Ireland semi-finals with three different teams: Cork (1975, 1984), Waterford (2002, 2004, 2006, 2007) and Limerick (2009). In addition, he was in charge of Clare in the 1978 Munster final, when a win would have qualified them directly for the all-Ireland final.
 Fourteen individuals have won the All-Ireland as a player then later as a manager:
 Johnny Clifford of Cork won as a player in 1954 and as a manager in 1986.
 Ollie Walsh of Kilkenny won as a player in 1957, 1963, 1967 and 1969 and as a manager in 1992, and 1993.
 Michael "Babs" Keating of Tipperary won as a player in 1964, 1965 and 1971 and as a manager in 1989 and 1991.
 Eddie Keher of Kilkenny won as a player in 1963, 1967, 1969, 1972, 1974 and 1975 and as a co-manager in 1979.
 Justin McCarthy of Cork won as a player in 1966 and as a co-manager in 1984.
 Pat Henderson of Kilkenny won as a player in 1967, 1969, 1972, 1974 and 1975 and as a manager in 1979, 1982 and 1983.
 Brian Cody of Kilkenny won as a player in 1975, 1982 and 1983 and as a manager in 2000, 2002, 2003, 2006, 2007, 2008, 2009, 2011, 2012, 2014, 2015
 Jimmy Barry-Murphy of Cork won as a player in 1976, 1977, 1978, 1984 and 1986 and as a manager in 1999.
 John Allen of Cork won as a player in 1978 and as a manager in 2005.
 Dónal O'Grady of Cork won as a player in 1984 and as a manager in 2004.
 Nicky English of Tipperary won as a player in 1989 and 1991 and as a manager in 2001.
 Davy Fitzgerald of Clare won as a player in 1995 and 1997 and as a manager in 2013.
 Eamonn Cregan of Limerick won as a player in 1973 and as a manager with Offaly in 1994.
 Michael Ryan of Tipperary won as a player in 1991 and as a manager in 2016

Team results table
This section represents in colour-coded tabular format the results of GAA county teams in the All-Ireland Senior Hurling Championship since 1997.

Prior to 1997, counties played in separate provincial championships, with only four provincial champions coming together in the All-Ireland semi-finals, and it is difficult to directly compare results across counties. Since 1997, several beaten teams from the provincial championships play together in the All-Ireland qualifier series.

Table
 Used in all seasons
  — Champions
  — Runners-up
  — All-Ireland semi-finals (3rd–4th place)
 ♥ — Munster champions
 ♦ — Leinster champions
 — — did not compete

 Current (2018–19, 2022– structure)
  — All-Ireland quarter-finals (5th–6th place)
  — All-Ireland preliminary quarter-finals (7th–8th place)
   — Leinster/Munster round robin, 4th place (9th–10th place)
    — Leinster/Munster round robin, 5th place (11th–13th place)

 2020–21 structure
  — All-Ireland quarter-finals (5th–6th place)
  — Second qualifier round; won one qualifier game (7th place)
  — First qualifier round; won one provincial game (8th place)
    — Lost all their games (9th–11th place)

Past

The All-Ireland championship has used many different competition structures since 1997, and it is not always obvious how to rank teams. In general, the colouring code for champions (red), runners-up (orange) and semi-finalists (yellow) holds true. After that, teams are shaded green, blue, purple and grey in descending order of performance. 
The Ulster Senior Hurling Championship has not had any bearing on the All-Ireland championship since 2005 so it is not included from that year onward.
There have been some changes of provincial championship:
Galway competed in the Connacht Senior Hurling Championship until 1998; they have played in the Leinster Senior Hurling Championship since 2009
Kerry competed in the Munster Senior Hurling Championship until 2004; they played in the Leinster Senior Hurling Championship in 2016 and 2017
Antrim compete in the Ulster Senior Hurling Championship, however, it has not been part of the All-Ireland since 2004; they played in the Leinster Senior Hurling Championship from 2009 to 2015
London competed in the Ulster Senior Hurling Championship until 2004; they played in the Leinster Senior Hurling Championship in 2013 and 2014

Abbreviations used:

Results table

All-Ireland Appearances by County
(Does not include Provincial Championship or Qualifiers)

Non-Irish teams 
London became the first overseas team to compete in the All-Ireland Championship in 1900. For four consecutive years they were given a bye to the All-Ireland final where they played the "home" champions in the final proper. They won their only All-Ireland title in 1901. London returned to the All-Ireland Championship on a number of occasions between 1969 and 1996.

In 1905 Lancashire and Glasgow entered the All-Ireland Championship at the quarter-final stage. Lancashire returned for one more championship campaign in 1913 whilst Glasgow returned for the 1910 and 1913 championships.

New York fielded a team in an expanded All-Ireland Championship in 1996.

Teams

2023 Teams

Former Teams

Defunct Teams

Lower Tiers

Tier 2: All-Ireland Senior B Hurling Championship/Joe McDonagh Cup

See also
 All-Ireland Senior Football Championship records and statistics

References

Records and statistics
Hurling records and statistics